Albert Frederick Reay (15 September 1901 – 31 December 1962) was an English professional footballer who played as a left back in the Football League for Gillingham and Norwich City.

Career statistics

References 

1901 births
1962 deaths
People from West Derby
Association football fullbacks
English footballers
Gnome Athletic F.C. players
Brentford F.C. players
Gillingham F.C. players
Norwich City F.C. players
Sheppey United F.C. players
Guildford City F.C. players
English Football League players
Footballers from Liverpool